The Amis House is a historic house at the northeast corner of 2nd and Mark Streets in Fordyce, Arkansas.  Built c. 1900, the two story wood-frame house is one of only two documented I-houses in Dallas County, and is further unusual because it appears in an urban rather than rural setting.  The basic I-house plan is extended by a projecting two-story gable bay in the center of the main facade, which has the entry below and a pair of double-hung sash windows above.  A single-story porch extends across the front, supported by four Tuscan columns.

The house was listed on the National Register of Historic Places in 1983.

See also
National Register of Historic Places listings in Dallas County, Arkansas

References

Houses on the National Register of Historic Places in Arkansas
Houses completed in 1900
Houses in Dallas County, Arkansas
Buildings and structures in Fordyce, Arkansas
National Register of Historic Places in Dallas County, Arkansas